'Siddhivinayak Technical Campus, School of Engineering & Research Technology and School of Polytechnic & Research Technology (STC'') at Shegaon, (Buldhana District) in Maharashtra, India is an Engineering college in the Vidarbha region. STC is a private engineering institute run by "Vasundhara Bahuddeshiya Samajik Sanstha" granting Diploma & Bachelor's degree in Engineering (Diploma & BE) with specialization in Electrical Engineering (Electronics & Power), Electronics & Telecommunications Engineering, Mechanical Engineering, Computer Science & Engineering and Civil Engineering. It is affiliated to Sant Gadge Baba Amravati University, at Amravati. The entire campus of the college is Wi-Fi enabled.1. IIT Bombay Remote Centre :Siddhivinayak Technical Campus is authorized remote centre of Indian Institute of Technology Bombay(IITB).List of Conducted Workshops under this scheme:                                 • Aakash For Education - For Teachers(10 Nov - 11 Nov 2012)

                                 • Research Methods In Educational Technology -  For Teachers (2 Feb - 9 Jan 2013)

                                 • Aakash Android Application Programming - Students - Opencourseware (23 Feb - 3 Mar 2013)2. Aakash Tablet Research Center : Siddhivinayak Technical Campus''' is authorized Aakash Tablet Research center under Indian Institute of Technology Bombay(IITB). With Remote Centre Code 1245 Aakash project is primarily an R&D project.

Universities and colleges in Maharashtra
All India Council for Technical Education
Sant Gadge Baba Amravati University
Education in Buldhana district